Minuscule 495 (in the Gregory-Aland numbering), ε 243 (in the Soden numbering), is a Greek minuscule manuscript of the New Testament, on parchment. Palaeographically it has been assigned to the 12th-century. 
Scrivener labelled it by number 581.
The manuscript is lacunose, marginalia are full. It was adapted for liturgical use.

Description 

The codex contains the text of the four Gospels on 181 parchment leaves (size ) with small lacuna at the beginning. The text is written in one column per page, 28-29 lines per page. The headings of the Gospels are titled in way εκ του κατα...

There is also a division according to the smaller Ammonian Sections, with references to the Eusebian Canons.

It has marginal notes.
It has not the Eusebian Canon tables but there is a space for it.

Text 

The Greek text of the codex is a representative of the Byzantine text-type. Hermann von Soden did not include it to the subfamilies of the Byzantine text, he classified it is a member of the I' group with 28 other manuscripts. Wisse classified it as Kmix (a mixture of the Byzantine families). Aland did not place it in any Category.

It has some unique readings and many corrections.

History 

The manuscript is dated by the INTF to the 12th-century.

In 1846 the manuscript was bought together with the codex 496 from captain C. K. MacDonald, who visited Sinai (and saw Codex Sinaiticus). The manuscript was added to the list of New Testament manuscripts by Scrivener (581) and C. R. Gregory (495). It was examined by Scrivener and Bloomfield.

It is currently housed at the British Library (Add MS 16183) in London.

See also 

 List of New Testament minuscules
 Biblical manuscript
 Textual criticism

Notes

References

Further reading

External links 

 Minuscule 495 at the Encyclopedia of Textual Criticism
 Add MS 16183 at the British Library

Greek New Testament minuscules
12th-century biblical manuscripts
British Library additional manuscripts